Draco palawanensis is a species of agamid lizard. It is found in the Philippines.

References

Draco (genus)
Reptiles of the Philippines
Reptiles described in 2000
Taxa named by Jimmy Adair McGuire
Taxa named by Angel Chua Alcala